Drakontio is a village of the Lagkadas municipality. The 2011 census recorded 231 inhabitants in the village. Drakontio is a part of the community of Kolchiko.

See also
List of settlements in the Thessaloniki regional unit

References

Populated places in Thessaloniki (regional unit)